Sons of Cain is a 1985 play by David Williamson about three female investigative reporters.

It looks at the New South Wales Labor government of the 1980s.

Production
Williamson directed the original production himself, the first time he had done this with one of his own plays. He says he did five full drafts of the play over a period of six months.

The original production starred Max Cullen and was critically acclaimed. It was presented in London in 1986 by the Australian Elizabethan Theatre Trust.

References

External links

Play details at David Williamson website

Plays by David Williamson
1989 plays